The President of the Board of Control for Cricket in India is the highest post at the Board of Control for Cricket in India (BCCI), which administers cricket in India. Though the post is an honorary one, it is considered a highly prestigious post due to popularity of the game in the India and the financial clout of the organisation. Over the years influential politicians, royalty and businessmen have occupied the post of President. The president is elected at the BCCI's Annual General Meeting with each of the 30 affiliates of the BCCI getting a vote. The outgoing president also has a vote as chairman of the meeting. The post is rotated zone-wise across India and a person can hold the post of BCCI president for a maximum of three years.

Supreme Court of India said that the most senior BCCI vice-president and the joint secretary would take over the interim roles of president and secretary respectively. In April 2016, Rahul Johri was appointed first ever Chief Executive Officer of BCCI. In its report in January 2016, the three-member Lodha Committee recommended the creation of the post of the CEO, with panel stressing the need for the BCCI to separate its governance and management duties, with the CEO taking charge of the management side and also made recommendations for a clear segregation of operational duties from the governance and policy-makers in the board.

List

Notes

References

External links 
 Complete list of BCCI Presidents

Indian sports executives and administrators
Indian cricket lists